Kevin Buck Dahl (born December 30, 1968) is a Canadian former professional ice hockey player who played in the NHL with the Calgary Flames, Phoenix Coyotes, Toronto Maple Leafs, and Columbus Blue Jackets. He played defense and shot right-handed.

Playing career
Dahl was born in Regina, Saskatchewan. As a youth, he played in the 1981 Quebec International Pee-Wee Hockey Tournament with a minor ice hockey team from Burlington, Ontario. Dahl later played minor hockey in Thunder Bay, Ontario.  He played Midget for the Thunder Bay Comets before signing with the Stratford Cullitons Jr.B. hockey club in 1985.  Dahl was a tenth round pick (149th overall) in the 1985 OHL Priority Selection by the S.S. Marie Greyhounds, however, he decided to accept a scholarship to Bowling Green State (CCHA).

Dahl was drafted by the Montreal Canadiens in the 11th round, 230th overall in the 1988 NHL Entry Draft while playing for Bowling Green State University. After being drafted Dahl continued playing in college until 1990. For the 1990–1991 season Dahl turned pro and joined the Fredericton Canadiens of the AHL for part of the season. He also played for the Winston-Salem Thunderbirds of the ECHL. For the 1991–1992 season Dahl joined the Canadian National team for most of the season and also represented Canada in the 1992 Winter Olympics, scoring 2 goals in 8 games.

Dahl signed as a free agent with the Calgary Flames in 1991 and joined the team for the 1992–1993 season after his time with the Canadian National team. That year he appeared in a career high 61 games with the Flames. Dahl spent the next 3 seasons with the Flames, scoring a career high 12 points during the lockout shortened 1994–1995 season.

Dahl signed with the Phoenix Coyotes in 1996. He would play only two games with the Coyotes during the 1996–1997 season however, spending the majority of the year in the minors with the Las Vegas Thunder. The following year, he resigned with the Flames and played 19 games with the team during the 1997–1998 season, spending most of the year with the Chicago Wolves. He was signed by the St. Louis Blues in 1998 but released a month later and signed by the Toronto Maple Leafs. He appeared in 3 games with the Maple Leafs for the 1998–1999 season, once again spending most of the year with the Chicago Wolves.

Dahl spent the majority of the next two seasons with the Wolves. He was signed by the Columbus Blue Jackets and played briefly during their inaugural season (2000–2001), appearing in 4 games. He then played 3 years with the Nuernberg Ice Tigers of the DEL in Germany before retiring in 2004.

Career statistics

Regular season and playoffs

International

References

External links
 

1968 births
Living people
Bowling Green Falcons men's ice hockey players
Calgary Flames players
Canadian people of Norwegian descent
Chicago Wolves (IHL) players
Columbus Blue Jackets players
Fredericton Canadiens players
Ice hockey people from Ontario
Ice hockey people from Saskatchewan
Ice hockey players at the 1992 Winter Olympics
Las Vegas Thunder players
Medalists at the 1992 Winter Olympics
Montreal Canadiens draft picks
Nürnberg Ice Tigers players
Olympic ice hockey players of Canada
Olympic medalists in ice hockey
Olympic silver medalists for Canada
Phoenix Coyotes players
Saint John Flames players
Salt Lake Golden Eagles (IHL) players
Sportspeople from Regina, Saskatchewan
Sportspeople from Thunder Bay
Toronto Maple Leafs players
Winston-Salem Thunderbirds players
Canadian expatriate ice hockey players in Germany
Canadian expatriate ice hockey players in the United States
Canadian ice hockey defencemen